Châu Phong Hòa (born 14 August 1985 in Đồng Tháp, Vietnam) is a Vietnamese footballer who plays for home club Vissai Ninh Bình. He was called to Vietnam national football team at 2007 AFC Asian Cup.

References

External links 
 

1985 births
Living people
People from Đồng Tháp Province
Vietnamese footballers
Association football midfielders
Vietnam international footballers
2007 AFC Asian Cup players
Becamex Binh Duong FC players
V.League 1 players
Dong Thap FC players